Sashi Menon (born 9 August 1952) is a former professional tennis player from India. He enjoyed most of his tennis success while playing doubles. During his career, he won three doubles titles.

Career finals

Doubles (3 wins, 1 loss)

External links
 
 

Indian male tennis players
Racket sportspeople from Chennai
1952 births
Living people